Henrik Grue Bastiansen (born 1964) is a Norwegian historian who specializes in media studies.

He took the doctorate at the University of Oslo in 2006, with the thesis Da avisene møtte TV. Partipressen, politikken og fjernsynet 1960-1972. He has published several books, about topics such as freedom of speech in Norway, the Norwegian press, the Norwegian Broadcasting Corporation, television documentaries and telephony, as well as general media history. Participated in the establishment of The University of Oslo Film Society 1989. Scholarship from The Research Council of Norway 1994. Academic degrees: Cand. Mag. (1991), Cand. Philol. (1995) and Dr. art. (2006). Member of the jury of the Norwegian Contest for Young Scientists 2001–2013. Member of the jury of the Holberg Prize School Project 2005–2011. Editor of book reviews in Norsk Medietidsskrift 2011–2015. Head of the jury of The Freedom of Expression Foundation's Competition for Young People 2013–2016. Chair on scientific conferences in Copenhagen (2015), Toronto (2016) and Tampere (2017). Leader of the Norwegian Association of Media History since 2017. Professor at Faculty of Media and Journalism at Volda University College, Norway.

Selected bibliography

 Bastiansen, Henrik G. (2017): "Finne, granske, skrive: Kort innføring i mediehistorisk metode", in Mediehistorisk Tidsskrift nr. 27/2017, page 125–141,Oslo: Norsk Mediehistorisk Forening
 Bastiansen, Henrik G. (2018): "Da Berlinmuren falt. En komparativ studie av presse, radio og TV i 1989", in Mediehistorisk Tidsskrift nr. 29/2018, page 35–90, Oslo: Norsk Mediehistorisk Forening
 Bastiansen, Henrik G., Martin A. Klimke and Rolf Werenskjold (eds., 2019): Media and the Cold War. Between Star Wars and Glasnost, New York: Palgrave MacMillan
 Bastiansen, Henrik G.: "Reporting Glasnost. The Changing Soviet News in a Norwegian Daily, 1985-1988", in Henrik G. Bastiansen, Martin A. KLimke and Rolf Werenskjold (eds. 2019): Media and the Cold War. Between Star Wars and Glasnost, New York: Palgrave MacMillan

References

List of publications in BIBSYS

1964 births
Living people
20th-century Norwegian historians
University of Oslo alumni
Media historians
21st-century Norwegian historians